Netechma parindanzana is a species of moth of the family Tortricidae. It is found in Peru.

The wingspan is 16 mm. The ground colour of the forewings is white with black markings. The hindwings are creamish, but brownish on the periphery.

Etymology
The species name refers to the closely related species Netechma indanzana.

References

Moths described in 2010
Netechma